Congress (Dolo), a group that split away from Indian National Congress in Arunachal Pradesh. Congress (D) was founded July 25, 2003 by Kameng Dolo. Together with Gegong Apang of Arunachal Congress, Congress (D) formed a state government. On August 30, 2003, Congress (D) merged with Bharatiya Janata Party.

See also
Indian National Congress breakaway parties

References

Defunct political parties in Arunachal Pradesh
Indian National Congress breakaway groups
Political parties in Arunachal Pradesh
2003 establishments in Arunachal Pradesh
2003 disestablishments in India
Political parties established in 2003
Political parties disestablished in 2003